Albert Hellyer (July 14, 1860 – September 7, 1945) was a Canadian politician, who represented the electoral district of Wellington East from 1919 to 1920 in the Legislative Assembly of Ontario. He was a member of the United Farmers of Ontario.

Hellyer, a farmer from Kenilworth, was elected to the legislature in the 1919 election. However, after just a few weeks in office he resigned his seat to allow cabinet minister William Raney to enter the legislature in a by-election. In exchange, he was appointed to a special provincial commission on land title and civil service reform.

References

External links 

1860 births
1945 deaths
United Farmers of Ontario MLAs
People from Wellington County, Ontario